Neobrachytherium is an extinct genus of proterotheriid mammal from the Late Miocene of Argentina and Uruguay. It is represented by multiple species, including the type N. intermedium, originally named in 1891 by Moreno and Mercerat as a species of Licaphrium, N. morenoi, originally named in 1914 by Rovereto as a species of Brachytherium, and N. ameghinoi and N. ullumense, named in 2001 by Soria, who reclassified all the species in the new genus Neobrachytherium. The various species are known from cranial and dental material from the Corral Quemado, Loma de las Tapias and Ituzaingó Formations. Neobrachytherium may be closely related to Thoatherium, Diadiaphorus and Thoatheriopsis.

References

Proterotheriids
Miocene mammals of South America
Pliocene mammals of South America
Chasicoan
Huayquerian
Montehermosan
Chapadmalalan
Neogene Argentina
Fossils of Argentina
Ituzaingó Formation
Neogene Uruguay
Fossils of Uruguay
Fossil taxa described in 2001
Prehistoric placental genera